Morpeth may refer to:
Morpeth, New South Wales, Australia
Electoral district of Morpeth, a former electoral district of the Legislative Assembly in New South Wales
Morpeth, Ontario, Canada
Morpeth, Northumberland, England, UK
Morpeth (UK Parliament constituency), a former parliamentary constituency
Morpeth Grammar School or King Edward VI School, a voluntary controlled academy in Morpeth, England
Morpeth railway station, a railway station on the East Coast Main Line
Morpeth Town A.F.C., a football club in Morpeth, England
Morpeth School, a secondary school in the East End of London, England, UK

People with the surname
Douglas Morpeth (1924–2014), British accountant

See also
Morpeth Arms, a public house in the Pimlico district of London
Morpeth Dock, part of Birkenhead docks, Merseyside
Morpeth Herald, a weekly newspaper published in Morpeth, England
Morpeth House, a building in Ipswich, Suffolk
Viscount Morpeth, the title of the heir apparent to the Earl of Carlisle